The 2013 IIHF World Championship Division III was an international Ice hockey tournament run by the International Ice Hockey Federation. Group A was contested in Cape Town, South Africa, from 15 to 21 April 2013 and the qualification tournament was contested in Abu Dhabi, United Arab Emirates, from 14 to 17 October 2012.

Participants

Group A

Qualification tournament

Venues
Group A was played in Grandwest Ice Arena, Cape Town. The qualification tournament was played in Abu Dhabi Arena, Abu Dhabi.

Officials
The IIHF selected 7 referees and 12 linesmen to work the 2013 IIHF World Championship DIV III. 
Division III has 4 referees and 7 linesman. Division III Qualification had 3 referees and 5 linesman. 

They were the following:

2013 IIHF Ice Hockey World Championship Division III in South Africa

Referees
  Vedran Krcelić
  Mikko Kaukokari
  Stian Halm
  Marius Iliescu

Linesmen
  Maarten van den Acker
  Sindri Gunnarsson
  Elvijs Trankalis
  Tomas Lauksedis
  Ramon Sterkens
  Jonathan Burger
  Ryan Marsh

2013 IIHF Ice Hockey World Championship Division III Qualification in the United Arab Emirates

Referees
  Ladislav Smetana
  Rasmus Toppel
  Djordje Fazekas

Linesmen
  Todor Krastev
  Benas Jaksys
  Louis Beelen
  Alejandro Garcia Banos
  Michael Rohrer

Qualification tournament

Standings

Fixtures and results
All times local (UTC+4).

Statistics

Top 10 scorers

IIHF.com

Goaltending leaders
(minimum 40% team's total ice time)

IIHF.com

Group A Tournament

Standings

Schedule
All times local.

Statistics

Top 10 scorers

IIHF.com

Goaltending leaders
(minimum 40% team's total ice time)

IIHF.com

Tournament Awards
 Best players selected by the directorate
Best Goaltender: 
Best Forward: 
Best Defenceman:

References

External links
IIHF.com

2013
4
2013 in South African ice hockey
2013 in Irish sport
Ice hockey in Ireland
2012–13 in Greek ice hockey
2012–13 in Turkish ice hockey
IIHF
2013
2013
April 2013 sports events in Africa
Sports competitions in Cape Town
2010s in Cape Town
October 2012 sports events in Africa
Sports competitions in Dubai
2010s in Dubai